Buddleja lojensis is a species endemic to the Loja region of southern Ecuador, and Piura in Peru, where it grows on mountains, savannahs and scrub, notably near streams, at elevations of 1,600 – 2,550 m. The species was first identified and described by Norman in 1982.

Description
Buddleja lojensis is a dioecious shrub 1 – 3 m tall with yellowish bark. The young branches are subquadrangular, almost glabrous, bearing subsessile ovate or lanceolate leaves 7 – 10 cm long by 2.4 – 4 cm wide, membranaceous, glabrescent above and below. The pale yellow paniculate inflorescences are 7 – 15 cm long by 4 – 9 cm wide, comprising 2 – 3 orders of leafy-bracted branches bearing small cymules of 5 – 10 flowers, the corollas 2.5 – 4 mm long.

Cultivation
The species is not known to be in cultivation.

References

lojensis
Flora of Ecuador
Flora of Peru
Flora of South America
Vulnerable plants
Taxonomy articles created by Polbot
Dioecious plants